Bismarck is a 1940 German historical film directed by Wolfgang Liebeneiner and starring Paul Hartmann, Friedrich Kayßler, and Lil Dagover.

This film depicts the life of the Prussian statesman Otto von Bismarck, a German nationalist and lonely genius who withstands the Reichstag to act on behalf of the people. It was followed by a sequel Die Entlassung in 1942, with Emil Jannings taking over the title role.

The film was made at the Johannisthal Studios in Berlin by Tobis Film one of the leading German companies of the era.
It was shot at a variety of locations involving several related to the historic events of film including in Berlin, Vienna, Bad Gastein and Babelsberg Palace. Plau am See in Mecklenburg was also used for shooting. The film's sets were designed by the art directors Karl Machus and Erich Zander.

Plot summary 
The film recalls the nineteenth century desire for German unification which at the time was threatened from several corners.  From the liberals, from crown prince Frederich (who is shown as an English puppet) and the French who attempt to annex the left bank of the Rhine.  The historical feature opens in 1862 with King Wilhelm I appointing Bismarck as head of the Prussian government. With Germany divided into 35 different political entities and power transferred to various principalities, the nation is portrayed as desperately longing for national unity. The Austrian Kaiser, also wishing unity, appears unconcerned with the northern province. His  interest rests in asserting control over the German Confederation. Wilhelm I, unable to control the parliament, is on the verge of abdication. The crown prince and his English wife wish the installation of a British style government which may undermine German unity. The king's last resort is the appointment of Bismarck as his Prime Minister. Bismarck's first political act is to dissolve the Prussian parliament following the refusal of an opposition leader, Virchow, to finance military reform and rearmament plans.

From 1864 to 1871, Bismarck wages several wars against Denmark, Austria, and France. According to his main political principle; the most decisive political questions are not solved by parliamentary discussions and resolutions but by "Eisen und Blut", Iron (weaponry) and blood alone. The film concludes with the 1871 proclamation of a new German Empire at the Hall Of Mirrors in Versailles. United under the leadership of Prussia, the new nation is armed with a strong military force built to withstand powerful and malevolent neighbours.

Armed forces victories are depicted as the handiwork of one great man; the Battle of Königgrätz is viewed solely the work of General Moltke. There are no battlefield recreations.

The storyline blends history with Third Reich era propaganda such as the assassination attempt on Bismarck by Ferdinand Cohen-Blind, who the film calls, an "English Jew", heroically stopped by Bismarck, unscathed by bullets. Spending a few years in England, his motives are questioned  over his loyalty in preservation of the German state.  Surreptitiously viewing an "evil Jew" attempt to halt German unity, there is also an underlying twin theme of the disruption of  German Politics by the English. Bismarck believes this to be a sign from god that he is destined to unite Germany.

Released in the wake of the 1939 Molotov–Ribbentrop Pact, it depicts a parallel view to  Bismarck's that a Russian alliance will safeguard the Prussians in the east.

Premiere
It premiered at the Ufa-Palast am Zoo in Berlin on 6 December 1940. A print of the film scheduled for US opening arrived in New York in the spring of 1941. Though the US was not yet at war with Germany, the federal customs seized the film on the grounds of a tariff violation and it did not play.

Cast

References

Further reading

External links 

1940 films
1940s biographical films
1940s historical films
German biographical films
German historical films
1940s German-language films
German black-and-white films
Films of Nazi Germany
Films set in the 1860s
Films set in the 1870s
Films set in Berlin
Films set in Paris
Films set in Vienna
Films directed by Wolfgang Liebeneiner
Films set in the Kingdom of Prussia
Cultural depictions of Otto von Bismarck
Cultural depictions of Napoleon III
Tobis Film films
Prussian films
Films shot at Johannisthal Studios
Films set in 1864
Films set in 1871
Nazi antisemitic propaganda films